FTHS may refer to:

Frank–ter Haar syndrome
Freehold Township High School, in New Jersey, United States
Toyota FT-HS, a hybrid sports car concept

See also
FTH (disambiguation)